Prysyazhnyuk is a Ukrainian surname. Notable people with the surname include:

Anatolii Prysyazhnyuk (born 1953), Ukrainian politician and chief of militsiya
Mykola Prysyazhnyuk (born 1960), Ukrainian politician and government minister 

Ukrainian-language surnames